Wildauer is a surname. Notable persons with that name include:

 Markus Wildauer (born 1998), Austrian cyclist
 Martin Wildauer (born 1987), Austrian strongman
 Mathilde Wildauer (1820–1878), Austrian actress and opera singer

German-language surnames